Misconception may refer to:
 List of common misconceptions
 Scientific misconceptions
 "Misconception" (Law & Order), an episode of Law & Order
 Misconception (film), a 2014 documentary film directed by Jessica Yu

See also